Ahmed El Merghany (born 24 May 1988, in Cairo;) is an Egyptian footballer. He currently plays as a defensive midfielder for Dikernis.

In 2016, Merghany was suspended after describing the President of Egypt, Abdel Fattah el-Sisi, as a “failure” on Facebook.

References

1986 births
Living people
Egyptian footballers
Zamalek SC players
Al Masry SC players
Mansheyat Bani Hasan players
Expatriate footballers in Jordan
Expatriate footballers in Oman
Expatriate footballers in Kuwait
Egyptian Premier League players
Association football midfielders
Wadi Degla SC players
Al Tadhamon SC players
Kuwait Premier League players
Egyptian expatriate sportspeople in Kuwait
Egyptian expatriate sportspeople in Jordan
Egyptian expatriate sportspeople in Oman
Sur SC players
Oman Professional League players